Tascott railway station is located on the Main Northern line in New South Wales, Australia. It serves the southern Central Coast suburb of Tascott opening in October 1905.

Platforms & services
Tascott has two side platforms that are about 2 cars long. It is serviced by NSW TrainLink Central Coast & Newcastle Line services travelling from Sydney Central to Newcastle.

Transport links
Busways operate two routes via Tascott station:
55: Gosford station to Ettalong Beach
70: Gosford Hospital to Ettalong Beach

References

External links

Tascott station details Transport for New South Wales

Transport on the Central Coast (New South Wales)
Railway stations in Australia opened in 1905
Regional railway stations in New South Wales
Short-platform railway stations in New South Wales, 1 car or less
Main North railway line, New South Wales